This is a list of members of the Western Australian Legislative Assembly between the 1927 election and the 1930 election, together known as the 13th Parliament.

Notes
 Selby Munsie was appointed Minister for Mines and Health on 30 April 1927, and was therefore required to resign and contest a ministerial by-election on 9 May 1927, at which he was returned unopposed.
 Harry Millington and James Cunningham were appointed Minister for Agriculture and Minister for Goldfields Water Supplies respectively on 15 December 1927, and were therefore required to resign and contest ministerial by-elections on 23 December 1927, at which both were returned unopposed.
 On 3 October 1928, the Country member for Williams-Narrogin, Edward Johnston, resigned to contest a Senate seat at the upcoming federal election. Country candidate Victor Doney won the resulting by-election on 3 November 1928.
 On 13 October 1928, the Labor member for Mount Leonora, Thomas Heron, died. Labor candidate Peter Ernest Cowan was elected unopposed on 7 November 1928.
 On 15 October 1929, the Country member for Irwin, Charles Maley, died. His brother, Country candidate Henry Maley, won the resulting by-election on 19 November 1929.

Sources
 
 

Members of Western Australian parliaments by term